Bolesław Śmiały (film) is a Polish historical film about Bolesław II the Generous. It was released in 1971.

Cast 

 Ignacy Gogolewski − as Bolesław II Śmiały
 Jerzy Kaliszewski − as Stanisław ze Szczepanowa
 Aleksandra Śląska 
 Maria Ciesielska 
 Zdzisław Mrożewski 
 Kazimierz Opaliński 
 Michał Pawlicki 
 Kazimierz Meres 
 Mieczysław Voit 
 Piotr Fronczewski 
 Jerzy Zelnik 
 Krzysztof Machowski 
 Andrzej Zaorski 
 Maciej Englert 
 Mieczysław Stoor 
 Alicja Raciszówna 
 Jerzy Goliński 
 Czesław Lasota 
 Henryk Bąk 
 Halina Gryglaszewska 
 Tadeusz Schmidt 
 Maciej Góraj

References

External links
 

1971 films
Polish historical films
1970s Polish-language films
Films directed by Witold Lesiewicz
Films set in the 11th century
1970s historical films